The Chamber of Deputies was the lower house of the bicameral Union Parliament of Burma (Myanmar) from 1948 to 1962.  Under the 1947 Constitution, bills initiated and passed by the lower house, the Chamber of Deputies, were to be sent to the Chamber of Nationalities for review and revision.

The Chamber of Deputies had a number of seats constitutionally allocated at twice the number of the Chamber of Nationalities.

Speakers of the Chamber of Deputies

References

Legislatures of Myanmar
1948 establishments in Burma
1962 disestablishments in Burma
Defunct lower houses